"Dancing with Tears in My Eyes" is the second single from Lament, Ultravox's seventh studio album, released in May 1984.

The single effectively put Ultravox back on the map, peaking at no. 3 in the UK Singles Chart, and reaching the top 10 in several European countries. The song also entered the Australian and Canadian Top 75 but failed to chart in the US.

The 7" single was released in three versions: with a standard picture sleeve, with a gate-fold booklet sleeve, and with a gate-fold booklet sleeve and a clear vinyl disc. All versions had the same catalogue number, "UV 1", and the same tracks. The 12" was released in two versions, with the same catalogue number "UVX 1": in a stickered gatefold sleeve containing a band poster and in a standard picture sleeve.

"Dancing with Tears in My Eyes" was the second song that Ultravox performed during the Live Aid charity event at the old Wembley Stadium, on 13 July 1985, for which Ure also played the lead guitar.

Background 
According to lead singer Midge Ure, the lyrics were inspired by the Nevil Shute book On the Beach, which is about a group of people in Australia awaiting nuclear radiation stemming from a nuclear war in the Northern Hemisphere. "They knew it was the end but they had time to think about how they wanted to choose their final moments", Ure stated, "And that’s what “Dancing With Tears In My Eyes” was about."

Music video 
The music video was directed by Chris Cross and Midge Ure. The video follows an interpretation of the lyrics that differs from the original inspiration found in the novel On the Beach. Instead of depicting the impact and aftermath of nuclear war, the premise of the video is a catastrophic meltdown at an unnamed civilian nuclear power plant in the United Kingdom. Band members Chris Cross, Warren Cann and Billy Currie play workers and a police officer at the power plant, with Midge Ure playing the narrator, a man seeking to return home to his family amidst scenes of mass panic and the breakdown of ordinary life. The video thereafter depicts the actions of the narrator as described in the song; dancing with his wife (Diana Weston), listening to music, drinking champagne and awaiting the end. The song concludes over the impact of a nuclear explosion viewed from inside the narrator's house, producing the windblown living room scene depicted on the cover of the single. The video ends over silent cinefilm home movies of the narrator and his family in happier times, before the film is burned away by overexposure.

The song and music video reflected contemporary concerns around the issues of nuclear power as well as the threat of nuclear conflict. Both were released five years after the 1979 Three Mile Island accident in the United States and in the year after the escalation of Cold War tensions following the announcement of the U.S. Strategic Defense Initiative and the shooting down of Korean Air Lines Flight 007. The music video was also a near-contemporary of the BBC nuclear war drama Threads, which similarly depicted the psychological impact of impending nuclear catastrophe and its aftermath on the British population.

Track listing

7" vinyl

12" vinyl (UK and Europe)

12" vinyl (North America)

Chart performance

Weekly charts

Year-end charts

References

1984 singles
1984 songs
Chrysalis Records singles
Songs about dancing
Songs written by Billy Currie
Songs written by Chris Cross
Songs written by Midge Ure
Songs written by Warren Cann
Ultravox songs